Chazara heydenreichi is a butterfly species belonging to the family Nymphalidae. It can be found from Hindu Kush and the W. Himalaya across Middle Asia and Kazakhstan to the S. Altai.

The wingspan is 45–60 mm. The butterflies fly from June to August.

Subspecies
Chazara heydenreichi heydenreichi
Chazara heydenreichi hegesander Fruhstorfer, 1910 (Dzhungarsky Alatau, Tian-Shan)
Chazara heydenreichi nana Rühl, 1895 (western Pamirs, Ghissar, southern Ghissar, Darvaz, Alai)

External links
 Satyrinae of the Western Palearctic - Chazara heydenreichi

Chazara
Butterflies described in 1853